Alexander Minasi Movsisian (18 April 1858 – 7 August 1935), better known by his pen name Alexander Shirvanzadeh was an Armenian playwright and novelist.

History
Alexander Movsisian was born on 18 April 1858, into a tailor's family in Shamakhi, the center of the province of Shirvan (then Shemakha Governorate, Russian Empire, modern-day Azerbaijan) and later adopted the Persian-inspired pen-name Shirvanzade ("son of Shirvan"). He brought to fruition the social realist school blossoming in the Caucasus and particularly in Azerbaijan promoted by the philosopher and playwright Mirza Fatali Akhundov. At the age of 17, Shirvanzade went to work in the city of Baku, whose fortunes were beginning to rise with the boom in oil production. He immersed himself in Armenian, Azeri and Russian literature as well as reading Stendhal, Balzac, Flaubert, Zola and Shakespeare, his greatest love.

Working first as a clerk and then as an accountant for oil companies, Shirvanzade saw first-hand the social impact of industrialized oil production. He turned his shock and anger into a literature of protest, writing in many genres: novels, plays, short stories, and newspaper articles.

His later literary activities resulted in his imprisonment in Tiflis, an experience which led to his masterpiece, Chaos (1896–97). Returning to Baku, he became increasingly interested in women's issues, as shown in his play Evgine about women's suffrage, and Did She Have the Right? Shirvanzade's concerns with capitalism and feminism fuse in his drama, Namus ("Honor", 1904). In 1916, Maxim Gorky wrote that Shirvanzade's works "were known and read not only in the Caucasus but also in England, in the Scandinavian Peninsula, and Italy."

In his later years, Shirvanzade lived abroad, finally returning permanently to the USSR in 1926 and became a member of the Union of Azerbaijani Writers. He died in Kislovodsk in 1935, and was buried in Komitas Pantheon which is located in the city center of Yerevan.

Books
Chaos (1898), a novel describing the life of a large industrial city
Char ogi ("The Evil Spirit"), a novel about an epileptic woman.
Namus (1911), a play about the ill fate of two lovers, who were engaged by their families to each other since childhood, but because of violations of namus (a tradition of honor), the girl was married by her father to another person.

Legacy 
Several of Shirvanzade's works were adapted into films in Soviet Armenia: Namus in 1925, Char ogi in 1927, Patvi hamar in 1956, Morgani khnamin ("Morgan's In-law") in 1970, and Chaos in 1973. A street and a school in Yerevan are named after him, as well as a theater in Kapan.

Quotes
Source: Ara Baliozian
 "The esthetic judgment of our people has been corrupted. What we need is a literary periodical that will explain to us what exactly is this thing called literature. "
 "The narrow partisan propaganda line that is espoused by our press is the enemy of all literature."
 "You cannot be both a writer and a political activist. Those who say you can, have no conception of what literature really is."

Bibliography 
From the collection of the Library of Congress, Washington, DC:
Artistē (1924)
Char ogi; Namus; Patwi hamar (1979)
Erker: hing hatorov Collected works, 5 volumes. (1986–1988)
Erker (1983)
Erkeri zhoghovatsu: tasě hatorov (1959)
Evil spirit: a play Translated from the Armenian Char ogi by Nishan Parlakian. (1980) 
For the sake of honor Translated from Badvi hamar and with an introd. by Nishan Parlakian. (1976)
Erkeri liakatar zhoghovatsu (1934)
Iz-za chesti (1941)
Izbrannoe (1947, 1949, 1952)
Kʻaos: vēp (1956)
Melania: vēpik: kovkasean irakan keankʻitsʻ (1938)
Sobranie sochineniĭ 3 volumes. (1957)
Tsʻawagarě (1958)
Verjin shatruaně: sēnario (1937)
Yōtʻ patmuatskʻner (1920)

Notes

External links
"Alexander Shirvanzade"

1858 births
1935 deaths
People from Shamakhi
Armenian male writers
Armenian novelists
Armenian male novelists
Burials at the Komitas Pantheon
Male dramatists and playwrights
19th-century Armenian writers
20th-century Armenian writers
19th-century Armenian dramatists and playwrights
20th-century Armenian dramatists and playwrights
19th-century Armenian novelists
20th-century Armenian novelists
19th-century male writers
20th-century male writers